Chu Yung-kwang (Hangul: 주영광; 1 December 1920  – 28 September 1982) was a South Korean football midfielder who played for the South Korea in the 1954 FIFA World Cup. During this tournament he was captain of South Korea national football team.
He also played for Seoul Football Club.

Honours

South Korea
Asian Games Silver medal: 1954

References

External links

1920 births
1982 deaths
Sportspeople from Pyongyang
South Korean footballers
South Korea international footballers
Association football midfielders
1954 FIFA World Cup players
Asian Games medalists in football
Footballers at the 1954 Asian Games
Medalists at the 1954 Asian Games
Asian Games silver medalists for South Korea